Mount McAllister is a mountain rising to  on the west side of Weyerhaeuser Glacier,  northwest of Mount Blunt in the east of the Antarctic Peninsula. The peak was photographed from the air by the United States Antarctic Service, 1940, the Ronne Antarctic Research Expedition, 1947, the U.S. Navy, 1966, and was surveyed by the Falkland Islands Dependencies Survey, 1958–61. It was named by the Advisory Committee on Antarctic Names in 1977 for Lieutenant R.M. McAllister, United States Coast Guard, Operations Officer on  during U.S. Navy Operation Deep Freeze, 1975 and 1976.

References

External links

Mountains of Graham Land
Bowman Coast